The Scroll of the Parwanaya is a Mandaean religious text that describes the rituals of the five-day Parwanaya festival. Excluding the colophon, the text consists of 931 lines.

Manuscripts and translations
Copies of the scroll include Manuscript 24 of the Drower Collection (DC 24), currently held at the Bodleian Library. The scroll was originally copied by Yahya Bihram in 1832 at his sister's son's house in Muhammerah (Khorramshahr), Iran. The scroll was analyzed and translated into German by Bogdan Burtea in 2005.

Contents
The contents of the scroll are as follows.

Lines 1-81: Ritual preliminaries
Lines 82-99: šarḥ ḏ-qnasa ḏ-iuna ḏ-paruanaiia "The dove sacrifice of the Parwanaya"
Lines 99-243: šarḥ ḏ-dukrana lhdaia rba zadiqa "The memorial of the dead (dukrana) of the only great righteous"
Lines 244-300: šarḥ ḏ-ahaba ḏ-mania b-iuma ḏ-paruanaiia mandaiia gabra eu enta eu rba eu zuṭa "The offering of the garments on the day of Parwanaya (to all) Mandaeans, man or woman, great or small"
Lines 301-342: šarḥ ḏ-ahaba ḏ-mania ḏ-tarmida eu ganzibra "The offering of the garments of a priest or a ganzibra"
Lines 343-578: šarḥ ḏ-ṭabahata "The fathers/parents (ṭabahata)"
Lines 579-806: šarḥ ḏ-dukrana ḏ-sumaiia "The remembrance of the dead (dukrana) of the names"
Lines 807-931: šarḥ ḏ-zidqa brika ḏ-paruanaiia "The blessed alms of the Parwanaya"
Lines 932-53v: colophon

See also
List of Mandaean scriptures
Parwanaya

References

External links
Sharh Diwan d-Parwanaia (Mandaic text from the Mandaean Network)
Sharh Diwan d-Parwanaia (Mandaic text from the Mandaean Network)

Mandaean texts